John Barnhill may refer to:

John Barnhill (American football) (1903–1973), American football coach, college athletics administrator
John Barnhill (basketball) (1938–2013), NBA player
John Barnhill (politician) (1905–1971), assassinated Ulster Unionist Party member of the Senate of Northern Ireland

See also
John Barnhill Dickie (1829–1886), Canadian farmer, teacher and politician